Trout Creek is a small tributary of the Yukon River in the U.S. state of Alaska. In winter, a small cabin at the creek's mouth is a hospitality stop for the Yukon Quest sled dog race.

References 

Rivers of Alaska
Rivers of Southeast Fairbanks Census Area, Alaska
Rivers of Unorganized Borough, Alaska